The Department of Energy and Water Supply (DEWS) was a department of the Queensland Government which is responsible for the state's energy and water industries. The department's head office was at 1 William Street, Brisbane.

History
The Department of Energy and Water Supply was established on 3 April 2012, as part of a series of changes to the machinery of government after the LNP's win at the 2012 election. The department took on some functions of the Department of Environment and Resource Management and the Department of Employment, Economic Development and Innovation, which were both dissolved. In 2017 the department was merged with the Department of Natural Resources and Mines to form the Department of Natural Resources, Mines and Energy.

See also

Department of Environment and Science
Energy in Queensland

References

External links
Department website

Energy and Water Supply
Energy in Queensland